To be blown off course in the sailing ship era meant be to diverted by unexpected winds, getting lost possibly to shipwreck or to a new destination. In the ancient world, this was especially a great danger before the maturation of the Maritime Silk Road in the Early Middle Ages, finding expression in the writing of Cosmas Indicopleustes. Even in later eras, the ship could attempt to limit its divergence by tacking or heaving to, but it was often difficult to keep track by mere celestial navigation before the invention of the marine chronometer in the late 18th century.

A number of "discoveries" during the Age of Discovery were accidentally found in this way, and the serendipity of being blown off course is also a trope in fiction. Accidental discovery may have played a larger role than previously acknowledged in early European colonialism in contrast to the idea of a centrally-planned program as by Prince Henry the Navigator, but it is also thought that the Austronesian expansion was more directed and purposeful than once thought, rather than being the result of accidental drift.

Historical voyages
640 BC: Colaeus
116 BC: Eudoxus of Cyzicus
62 BC: "Indos quosdem", survivors of an Indian shipwreck in Suebi presented to Quintus Caecilius Metellus Celer, as recorded by Cornelius Nepos and Pomponius Mela
50: Rhapta
412: Faxian
986: Bjarni Herjólfsson
999: Leif Erikson
1312: Lancelotto Malocello
1349: Giovanni de' Marignolli
1406: Thorstein Olafsson
1418: João Gonçalves Zarco and Tristão Vaz Teixeira
1488: Bartolomeu Dias
1500: 2nd Portuguese India Armada
1505: Lourenço de Almeida
1525: Gomes de Sequeira
1527: Narváez expedition
1535: Fray Tomás de Berlanga
1543: António Mota
1578: Golden Hind
1599: Dirck Gerritsz Pomp
1609: Sea Venture
1615: Eggert Ólafsson
1616: Eendracht
1620: Mayflower
1638: Nuestra Señora de la Concepción
1654: Jewish arrival in New Amsterdam
1675: Anthony de la Roché
1707: Scilly naval disaster
1770: First voyage of James Cook
1815: Arniston

Historical states and lost sailors
Lê dynasty in Vietnam
Sakoku in Japan

In popular culture
Odyssey
Aeneid
A True Story
Sinbad the Sailor
The Tempest
Gulliver's Travels
Wasobyoe
"MS. Found in a Bottle"

See also
Drift migration
North Korean ghost ships

References

Winds
Age of Discovery
Age of Sail
Maritime disasters
Navigation